, commonly referred to just as , is a fictional character in the anime and manga series Eyeshield 21, created by Riichiro Inagaki and Yusuke Murata. In the series, he is the captain of the Deimon Devil Bats, a high school American football club founded by him and two other students. Due to the lack of interest in the sport, Hiruma uses blackmail and threats to recruit players to Devil Bats. Hiruma witnesses Sena Kobayakawa's running abilities and forces the boy to join the team as the running back as soon as he can. Hiruma has appeared in other media from the series, including video games, original video animations (OVAs), and light novels.

According to Inagaki, Hiruma was created to be a "devil-hero", or a kind of anti-hero. Due to this, Murata, the manga's illustrator, tried to give Hiruma a demonic appearance. In the OVA, released before the anime's start, he is voiced by Shin-ichiro Miki. However, in the 2005 Japanese anime television series, he was replaced by Atsushi Tamura, who was chosen by the manga series creators due to his voice, which they believed was perfect for the role. His voice actor in the English adaptation is Derek Stephen Prince. Hiruma has been well received by publications for manga and anime. Numerous pieces of merchandise in Hiruma's likeness have also been released, including decals and statues of ceramic and resin.

Development and voice portrayal
Riichiro Inagaki, the writer of Eyeshield 21, has said that he developed Hiruma as a character that does not follow the Japanese concepts of emphasis on sportsmanship and effort in the game; instead, Hiruma is "only concerned with winning". Inagaki intended to make an "anti-hero" or, as he refers to the concept, a "devil-hero". Yusuke Murata, the artist, chose to portray Hiruma as looking "close to being a demon", since he heard from Inagaki that Hiruma had "the personality of a demon." Murata has noted that the Devil Bats logo "bears a strong resemblance to Hiruma". Inagaki also stated that Hiruma's name is a homage to the British former Formula One driver Damon Hill. He also visited a real military base to get inspiration for the one he draw when Hiruma's background is revealed.

He was voiced by Shin-ichiro Miki in the first anime adaptation of the Eyeshield 21 manga, a 2003 Jump Festa OVA titled The Phantom Golden Bowl. The subsequent television adaptation, however, did not use Miki; rather, Atsushi Tamura was chosen. Though the animation studio administrated casting, the studio asked Inagaki and Murata for their opinions. The two both felt that Tamura was a "perfect fit" due to "his voice and his style". In the English dubbing, the role was voiced by Derek Stephen Prince.

Appearances

In Eyeshield 21
Seven years prior to the start of the series, a ten-year-old Hiruma snuck into an American military base, where he witnessed a group of soldiers playing American football. He soon learned the sport's rules and managed to successfully gamble on the winning teams, accumulating a large amount of money. He entered Mao Junior High, where he met Ryokan Kurita, who encouraged Hiruma to create his own team. In order to establish an American football club, Hiruma created an information network to acquire blackmail, allowing him to threaten the vice principal of Mao into allowing the establishment of the club. Gen "Musashi" Takekura also decided to join, and the three new friends made a pact to reach the Christmas Bowl—the high school football league championship. They decided to join the Shinryuji Naga, but because Kurita could not pass the Shinryuji exam, Hiruma and Musashi went to Deimon High School, and with Kurita established the Deimon Devil Bats.

At the beginning of the series, Hiruma and Kurita, now in their second year of high school, attempt to recruit new members to the Deimon Devil Bats. At first, their only successful recruit is Sena Kobayakawa, as Hiruma witnesses his incredible running speed and agility and forces him to be the team's running back. Hiruma additionally hides Sena's identity by making him wear an eyeshield and adopt the moniker "Eyeshield 21". Hiruma, through intimidation, blackmail, cyber terrorism, and other similar methods, plays a crucial role in the development of the young Devil Bats team. Hiruma's insight and strategic mind, especially his knack for devising trick plays and his psychological games, are critical in the Devil Bats' various matches. His demonic façade is also seen through by the team manager, Mamori Anezaki, whom he shares a deep understanding with despite constant bickering and teasing.

After winning the Christmas Bowl, Hiruma is selected by the Ojo White Knights' Seijuro Shin to be one of Team Japan's two quarterbacks for the International Youth American Football tournament due to his knack for trick plays. Hiruma quickly settles in as the main strategist on the team. Even before this, Hiruma spies on Team USA to acquire information on the ace American players, who are considered by far the favorites to win the tournament. In typical fashion, Hiruma refuses to permit players on the team out of sympathy rather than merit, including his Devil Bats teammates, but does agree with the decision to hold a final tryout as a method of enlisting bench players. Two years later, Hiruma, now in college, is part of the college's American football team, Saikyouda, opposing some of his former teammates (students at other colleges) as they compete to play in the Rice Bowl—the game between the best college American football teams.

In other media
Hiruma has made several appearances outside of the Eyeshield 21 anime and manga. He appears in both of the original video animations produced for the series, helping the Deimon Devil Bats defeat the Uraharajuku Boarders in a tournament called the Golden Bowl in the first original video animation, and leaving his teammates on a desert island so they train in the second. Hiruma also appears in all Eyeshield 21 games, which usually feature the original manga story, except for Eyeshield 21: Devilbats Devildays, which features exclusive stories. He also appears in the crossover games Jump Super Stars and Jump Ultimate Stars as a supporting character.

Reception
The character of Hiruma has been well received by manga readers, and as the series continued he went on to become one of the most popular characters among the Eyeshield 21 reader base, having consistently placed near the top of the Weekly Shōnen Jump character popularity polls of the series. In the first poll he placed second, behind Sena, but in another two he ranked first. He was also chosen by the readers as the character who would win an "Evil Showdown" against Agon Kongo, as well as the best quarterback in the series. In an interview, Atsushi Tamura said about Hiruma: "I look just like this guy"; and stated that he "think[s] there is a lot of other people who want to do the Hiruma's role". Several pieces of merchandise based on Hiruma have also been released, including decals and statues of ceramic and resin.

Several publications for manga and anime have commented on Hiruma's character. Chris Beveridge from Mania.com stated that "the outlandish nature of Hiruma with his guns blazing gets old very quickly" and considered it a "downside" to the series. On the other hand, Ain't It Cool News' Scott Green said that "impish Hiruma starts out as a unique star." Mania.com's Jarred Pine noted that Hiruma is "so completely over-the-top and out of left field that I couldn't help laughing" and that his "rude, crude, and completely unpredictable" behavior "makes his character so damn enjoyable". Pine concluded that Hiruma's personality was "instantly memorable" and his "unpredictable nature" was responsible for making the story "so enjoyable". The contrast with "Sena's hard effort and Hiruma's trickery and devilish nature" was also praised by Pine. Writing for Anime News Network (ANN), Carlo Santos praised Hiruma's character design as "imaginative" with his "lanky" and "demon-like appearance" and additionally commented that "despite his sheer ruthlessness, it's hard not to laugh as Hiruma enthusiastically resorts to blackmail in recruiting students for the team". Erin Finnegan of ANN also noted the "demonic-looking" aspect of Hiruma, saying he is "like a predecessor of Ozu from The Tatami Galaxy with a love of football". ANN's Zac Bertschy called Hiruma the "most fun" character insofar, making note of his "brash, menacing and ultimately passionate" personality and that "in a sense, Hiruma turns the 'kindly old coach-come-mentor who helps the hero along' cliché on its ear". Chris Homer of The Fandom Post considered Hiruma "the most memorable part of the show", saying he is "everyone's favourite and most memorable character". Partly because of his "sheer insanity", demonstrated by his recruiting methods, and partly because of the fact he gradually shows care and trusts for the team Homer wrote that "he is an instantly memorable character" and "so unique in this show (and any show for that matter)".

Notes

References

Comics characters introduced in 2002
Eyeshield 21 characters
Fictional Japanese people in anime and manga
Fictional players of American football
Male characters in anime and manga
Teenage characters in anime and manga